BD Camelopardalis is an S star and symbiotic star in the constellation Camelopardalis.  It was recognized as a spectroscopic binary star in 1922, and its orbital solution published in 1984; it has a 596-day orbital period.  A spectroscopic composition analysis was done of the red giant primary star in 1986.

Description
Although the star's spectrum shows the spectral features of zirconium oxide which define spectral class S, BD Cam shows no technetium lines in its spectrum.  It is believed to be an "extrinsic" S star, one whose s-process element excesses originate in a binary companion star.  The system displays only minimal variations in the visible, but the presence of the companion and its interactions with the stellar wind of the visible red giant makes for easily observed time-variable spectral features in the ultraviolet and in the near infrared spectral line of helium.

At times BD Cam is the brightest S star in the visible sky, because other bright S stars are Mira variables or other types of variable star with large changes in apparent brightness.  Its own brightness variability in the visible part of the spectrum is modest.

References

 
 
 HR 1105
 Image BD Camelopardalis
 Symbiotic Star Blows Bubbles Into Space

Camelopardalis (constellation)
Slow irregular variables
S-type stars
022649
017296
1105
Camelopardalis, BD
Asymptotic-giant-branch stars
BD+62 0597